Ronald Baxter Henry (August 7, 1936 – May 14, 2016) was an American professional baseball player. He was a catcher who spent one full season (1961) and part of another (1964) in Major League Baseball as a member of the Minnesota Twins.

Henry's career lasted for 15 seasons (1954–68). The first seven were spent in the farm system of the Milwaukee Braves. He was chosen in the 1960 Rule 5 draft after batting .310 for the Austin Senators of the Double-A Texas League, and spent the entire 1961 campaign with the Twins in their first season in the Twin Cities. He was the club's third-string catcher (behind Earl Battey and Hal Naragon) and played in only 20 games, 14 as a pinch hitter. Henry batted only .143 with four hits, then spent the next 2 seasons in the minor leagues until his recall to Minnesota in June 1964. With Battey, a five-time American League All-Star, still entrenched as the Twins' regular receiver, Henry's opportunities again were limited. He appeared in 22 games, 13 as a catcher, and logged 41 at bats. He hit his only two Major League home runs, off Don Lee and Dave Vineyard, but made only three other hits.

Altogether, Henry appeared in 42 MLB games, with nine hits in 69 at bats. He resumed his minor league playing career in 1965.

Henry died on May 14, 2016, aged 79, in Denver, Colorado, of cardiovascular disease and end stage renal disease.

References

External links

1936 births
2016 deaths
20th-century African-American sportspeople
21st-century African-American people
African-American baseball players
American expatriate baseball players in Canada
American expatriate baseball players in Nicaragua
Austin Senators players
Baseball players from Pennsylvania
Boise Pilots players
Charlotte Hornets (baseball) players
Chester High School alumni
Corpus Christi Clippers players
Dallas Rangers players
Dallas–Fort Worth Spurs players
Denver Bears players
Louisville Colonels (minor league) players
Major League Baseball catchers
Minnesota Twins players
Oklahoma City 89ers players
People from Delaware County, Pennsylvania
Sportspeople from Chester, Pennsylvania
Topeka Hawks players
Toronto Maple Leafs (International League) players
Vancouver Mounties players
Wellsville Braves players
Wichita Braves players